UK-DMC 3 is a constellation of three British Earth imaging satellites which are operated by DMC International Imaging. They were constructed by Surrey Satellite Technology and launched by ISRO on 10 July 2015.

Cost
Beijing based Twenty-First Century Aerospace Technology Company Limited (21AT) agreed for 110 million British pounds ($170.2 million) to cover the entire cost of the three satellites' delivery in orbit.

See also

UK-DMC
UK-DMC 2
2015 in spaceflight

References

External links
UK-DMC3 Mission pages from manufacturer SSTL 

Spacecraft launched in 2015
Satellites of the United Kingdom
Spacecraft launched by PSLV rockets
2015 in the United Kingdom
Satellite constellations
Earth imaging satellites